Hanebado! is an anime series adapted from the manga of the same title by Kōsuke Hamada. It aired from July 2 to October 1, 2018 on Tokyo MX and other channels. It ran for 13 episodes in 6 DVD/Blu-ray releases. The series was directed by Shinpei Ezaki and written by Taku Kishimoto, with animation by Liden Films. Satoshi Kimura provided the character designs, and Tatsuya Kato composed the music. Due to the 2018 Hokkaido earthquake, the last three episodes were delayed by a week.

The series was simulcast worldwide outside Asia by Crunchyroll with English subtitles, and in North America, the British Isles and Australasia with an English dub by Funimation.


Episode list

Home releases

Japanese
In Japan, Toho released the series in 6 volumes starting from September 19, 2018 to February 13, 2019.

English

Notes

References

Hanebado!